Urban Lindgren (born 18 April 1973 in Morjärv, Norrbotten) is a Swedish cross-country skier who competed from 1993 to 2002. He earned a silver medal in the 4 × 10 km relay at the 2001 FIS Nordic World Ski Championships in Lahti, and finished 14th in the 30 km event at those same championships.

Lindgren's best individual finish at the Winter Olympics was 17th in the 15 km event at Salt Lake City in 2002. He also won four races up to 15 km in his career from 1998 to 2000.

Cross-country skiing results
All results are sourced from the International Ski Federation (FIS).

Olympic Games

World Championships
 1 medal – (1 silver)

World Cup

Season standings

Team podiums
 1 victory – (1 ) 
 4 podiums – (3 )

References

External links

Swedish male cross-country skiers
1973 births
Living people
Cross-country skiers at the 2002 Winter Olympics
FIS Nordic World Ski Championships medalists in cross-country skiing
Piteå Elit skiers